Guyer Rock is a low rock lying  west of the Flyspot Rocks, Marguerite Bay, off the west coast of Graham Land, Antarctica. It was named in 1986 by the UK Antarctic Place-Names Committee after Captain Simon T.G. Guyer, Royal Marines, Officer of the Watch at the time HMS Endurance grounded on the rock in the 1985–86 season.

References

Rock formations of Graham Land
Fallières Coast